The Men's 69 kg weightlifting event at the 2014 Commonwealth Games in Glasgow, Scotland, took place at Scottish Exhibition and Conference Centre on 26 July.

Result

References

Weightlifting at the 2014 Commonwealth Games